Joseph or Joe Cox may refer to:

 Joe Cox (cricketer) (1886–1971), English cricketer
 Joe Cox (American football) (born 1986), American football player 
 Joe Cox (singer), English singer and contestant on the eighth and ninth series of The X Factor
 Joseph Buford Cox (1905–2002), inventor
 Joseph Winston Cox (1875–1939), American federal judge
 Joseph Richard Cox (1852–1934), Member of Parliament for East Clare, 1885–1892
 Joseph Cox (footballer) (born 1994), Panamanian footballer
 Joseph Mason Cox (1763–1818), English physician
 Joseph N. Cox, suspected murderer of Harry and Harriette Moore
 Joseph Cox (high sheriff) (1697–1753), High Sheriff of Berkshire

See also
Jo Cox (disambiguation)